Gilmore is an unincorporated community in Bond County, Illinois, United States. Gilmore is west of New Douglas.

References

Unincorporated communities in Bond County, Illinois
Unincorporated communities in Illinois